Arzu Sema Canbul (born July 14, 1973) is a Turkish former women's association footballer.

Early life
Canbul was born in Bad Urach in the state of Baden-Württemberg, West Germany.

Playing career

Club
In Turkey, she played in 1995–96 women's football league season for the Ankara-based club  Gürtaşspor. During the 1996–97 season, she moved to Istanbul to play for Zara Ekinlispor and helped the team win a championship title during the 1997–98 season. During the 1998–99 season, she transferred to Dostlukspor.

International
Canbul was admitted to the women's national football team and debuted at the UEFA Women's Euro 1997 qualification-Group 8 match against Bulgaria on October 21, 1997.

Honours
Turkish Women's Football League
 Zara Ekinlispor
 Champion (1): 1997–98

References

External links
 Turkish Football Federation player profile

Living people
1973 births
People from Bad Urach
Turkish women's footballers
Turkey women's international footballers
Women's association footballers not categorized by position
Footballers from Baden-Württemberg